The 2016 Summer Olympics torch relay which ran from 21 April until 5 August 2016. After being lit in Olympia, Greece, the torch traveled to Athens on the 27 April. The Brazilian leg began in the capital, Brasília, and ended in Rio de Janeiro's Maracanã Stadium, the main venue of the 2016 Olympics. After having visited more than 300 Brazilian cities, including all 26 state capitals and the Federal District. The end of the relay was the closing to the 2016 Summer Olympics opening ceremony.

Route in Greece

Route in Switzerland

Route in Brazil

End of Torch Relay
At the 2016 Summer Olympics opening ceremony, Gustavo Kuerten brought the Olympic torch into the stadium, relayed off the Olympic flame to Hortência Marcari, who relayed to Vanderlei de Lima. de Lima then lit the Olympic cauldron.

Torch bearers
Notable torch bearers include:

 Vanderlei de Lima: de Lima had been selected as the final torch bearer and the one who lit the cauldron after Pelé declined due to illness. de Lima had been attacked during his marathon run at the 2004 Olympics, when he was leading, making him a leading choice for the honor of last flame bearer.
 Hortência Marcari: Marcari is considered the greatest Brazilian female basketball player.
 Gustavo Kuerten: Kuerten is the best male tennis player in South America in history.
 Ban Ki-moon, Ban is the General Secretary of the United Nations
 Thomas Bach, Bach is the President of the International Olympic Committee
 Carlos Arthur Nuzman, Nuzman is the President of the Rio 2016 Summer Olympics Organizing Committee
 Adriana Lima, Lima is a Brazilian supermodel.
 Eduardo Paes, Paes is the mayor of Rio de Janeiro
Heloísa Pinheiro, Pinheiro was the source of inspiration for the bossa nova single The Girl from Ipanema.

References

External links

 3D model: "Rio 2016 Olympic torch". The 2016 Olympic torch (designed by Chelles & Hayashi), by Wilfried Vougny. April 21, 2016 (in French)
"En 5 Minutes - L'odyssey de la flamme olympique commence" "Le Journal de Montréal", by Wilfried Vougny, Apr. 21, 2016.

Torch Relay, 2016 Summer Olympics
Olympic torch relays